Haribhadra, also known as Shizi Xian or Sengge Zangpo (both names mean "righteous lion") was an 8th-century CE Buddhist philosopher, and a disciple of Śāntarakṣita, an early Indian Buddhist missionary to Tibet. He was one of the founding monks of the Vikramashila monastery. Haribhadra's commentary on the Abhisamayalankara was one of the most influential of the twenty-one Indian commentaries on that text, perhaps because of its author's status as Shantarakshita's student. Like his master, Haribhadra is retrospectively considered by Tibetan doxographical tradition to represent the Yogācāra-Svatantrika-Mādhyamaka school.

Haribhadra's interpretation of the Abhisamayalankara, particularly his four-kaya model, was controversial and contradicted the earlier normative interpretation popularized by Vimuktasena. Haribhadra claims, that Abhisamayalamkara chapter 8 is describing Buddhahood through four kayas: svabhavikakaya, [jnana]dharmakaya, sambhogakaya and nirmanakaya. Haribhadra's position was in turn challenged by Ratnākaraśānti and Abhayakaragupta. In Tibet the debate continued, with Je Tsongkhapa championing Haribhadra's position and Gorampa of the Sakya school promoting the other.

Notes

Indian Buddhist monks
Indian scholars of Buddhism
Mahayana Buddhism writers
Madhyamaka scholars
Tibetan Buddhists
Year of birth unknown
Year of death unknown
Yogacara scholars